Shadae Lawrence (born 31 December 1995) is a Jamaican athlete specialising in the discus throw. She represented her country at the 2016 Summer Olympics without qualifying for the final. She has qualified for the event for the 2020 Summer Olympics as well.

On May 22, 2021, she broke the Jamaican National Record with a personal best throw of 67.05	metres set in Tucson, AZ.

Lawrence is currently an assistant coach for the South Florida Bulls track and field team.

International competitions

References

1995 births
Living people
Jamaican female discus throwers
Athletes (track and field) at the 2016 Summer Olympics
Olympic athletes of Jamaica
People from Saint Catherine Parish
Kansas State Wildcats women's track and field athletes
Jamaican expatriates in the United States
Athletes (track and field) at the 2019 Pan American Games
Pan American Games competitors for Jamaica
Jamaican Athletics Championships winners
Colorado State Rams women's track and field athletes
Athletes (track and field) at the 2020 Summer Olympics
20th-century Jamaican women
21st-century Jamaican women